John Horley (born 23 January 1936) is an Australian cricketer. He played in one first-class match for South Australia in 1960/61.

See also
 List of South Australian representative cricketers

References

External links
 

1936 births
Living people
Australian cricketers
South Australia cricketers
Cricketers from Adelaide